Carnegie Hall is a quadruple live album by Frank Zappa and The Mothers of Invention, released posthumously on October 31, 2011, by the Zappa Family Trust on Vaulternative Records. It is a mono recording of the two shows given on October 11, 1971 at Carnegie Hall in New York and the sixth installment on the Vaulternative Records label that is dedicated to the posthumous release of complete Zappa concerts, following the releases of FZ:OZ (2002), Buffalo (2007), Wazoo (2007), Philly '76 (2009) and Hammersmith Odeon (2010).

The album was re-released on April 3, 2020, as a 3-CD set, omitting the performance of the support act, The Persuasions, which was originally included on the 2011 4-CD version.

History 
This is the official release of the live recording of Frank Zappa & the Mothers of Invention's debut (and only two) performances at the titular New York City's Carnegie Hall on October 11, 1971.

Track listing 
All songs written and composed by Frank Zappa except where noted.

For the 2020 3CD release, CD 1 is Disc 1-8 to 2-4 (total length:  70:31), and CD 2 is Disc 2-5 to 3-11 (56:57).  On this version, "Dog Breath" is 5:54, "Peaches en Regalia" is 4:04, "King Kong" is 29:43 and "200 Motels Finale" is 4:36.

Credits 

Produced/Performed/Conducted by Frank Zappa

(*)
 Medley #1: "Sunday Kind of Love" (Barbara Belle, Anita Nye, Louis Prima, Stanley Rhodes) / "Sincerely" (Harvey Fuqua, Alan Freed) / "A Thousand Miles Away" (William Henry Miller, James Sheppard) / "The Vow" (Zeke Carey, George Motola, Horace Webb) / "Why Don't You Write Me?" (Laura Grace Hollins) / "Goodnight Sweetheart, Goodnight" (Calvin Carter, James Hudson) / "Woo Woo Train" (Richard Barrett) / "I Only Have Eyes for You" (Al Dubin, Harry Warren) / "Creation of Love" (Richard Barrett, Stuart Wiener) / "Tears on My Pillow" (Al Lewis, Sylvester Bradford) / "The Great Pretender" (Buck Ram)
 Medley #2: "Don't Look Back" (William Robinson, Ronald A. White) / "Runaway Child, Running Wild" (Barrett Strong, Norman Whitfield) / "Cloud Nine" (Barrett Strong, Norman Whitfield)
 Medley #3: "He Ain't Heavy, He's My Brother" (Sidney Keith Russell, Robert William Scott) / "You've Got a Friend" (Carole King) / "Reach Out and Touch Somebody's Hand" (Nickolas Ashford, Valerie Simpson)

Personnel 
 Frank Zappa – lead guitar, vocals
 Mark Volman – vocals, percussion
 Howard Kaylan – vocals
 Ian Underwood – keyboards, Alto Sax
 Don Preston – Keyboards, Gong
 Jim Pons – bass, vocals
 Aynsley Dunbar – drums

Overlaps with other albums 
 Finer Moments
 Longer versions of "Pound For A Brown" and "King Kong" are included on the track "The Subcutaneous Peril"

References 

Frank Zappa live albums
2011 live albums
Albums recorded at Carnegie Hall
Live albums published posthumously